is Maaya Sakamoto's 5th studio album. Her style changed once again, mostly because Yoko Kanno did not compose any of the songs. Her voice also changed because of acting in Les Misérables. The first pressing came with a CD-ROM featuring music videos for "Loop" and "Honey Come".

Track listing

Charts

References

2005 albums
Maaya Sakamoto albums
Victor Entertainment albums